Chess at the 2007 Asian Indoor Games was held in Macau International Shooting Range, Macau, China from 26 October to 3 November 2007.

Medalists

Blitz

Rapid

Standard

Medal table

Results

Blitz

Men's individual
2 November

Preliminary round

Knockout round

Women's individual
2 November

Preliminary round

Knockout round

Mixed team
3 November

 Two match points were awarded to a team to score at least 2½ points in a match and one match point was awarded to a team to score 2 points in a match.

Rapid

Men's individual

Team competition
26–27 October

Knockout round
27 October

Women's individual

Team competition
26–27 October

 Shadi Paridar of Iran tied with Gulmira Dauletova in score on board 1 but defeated the latter in the play-off.

Knockout round
27 October

Mixed team
26–27 October

 Two match points were awarded to a team to score at least 2½ points in a match and one match point was awarded to a team to score 2 points in a match.

Standard

Men's individual

Team competition
28–30 October

Knockout round

Women's individual

Team competition

Knockout round

Mixed team
28–30 October

 Two match points were awarded to a team to score at least 2½ points in a match and one match point was awarded to a team to score 2 points in a match.

References
 Asian Chess Federation
 Official Website

2007 Asian Indoor Games events
Asian indoor games
2007
Asian indoor games 2007